The Imperial Cadet Corps (1901-1917) was a cadet corps or military school and was founded exclusively to give officer training to the princes and gentlemen of British India. It was founded in November 1901 under the direct surveillance of Lord Curzon  at Meerut and Dehradun. Major D. H. Cameroon was made its first commandant and Maharaja Pratap Singh of Idar was made its Honorary commandant. The youths between 17 and 20 years were selected and admitted as Imperial Cadets and their education was to be at any one of the Chief's college at Rajkot, Indore, Lahore,  Ajmer or Raipur. The selected cadets had to join the corps at Meerut or Dehradun. Though the ICC failed in course of time and was closed in 1917. It nevertheless established the precedent for the officer training of Indians in India, which resulted in founding of Indian Military Academy at Dehradun in 1932.

Notable alumni
Maharaja Pratap Singh of Idar
Maharajah Shrimant Sir Sajjan Singh of Ratlam
Major General Thakur Amar Singh of Kanota
Maharana Shri Sir Vijayasinhji Chhatrasinhji, Maharaja of Rajpipla
Maharawal Sir Shri Ranjitsimhji Mansimhji of Baria

References

Military academies
Military education and training in India
Military academies of India
Educational institutions established in 1901
1901 establishments in India
1917 disestablishments in India
Educational institutions disestablished in 1917
Schools in Colonial India
Boys' schools in India
Schools in Dehradun